Attorney General Jackson may refer to:

Edward St John Jackson (1886–1961), Attorney General of Ceylon
Fred S. Jackson (1868–1931), Attorney General of Kansas
Mortimer M. Jackson (1809–1889), Attorney General of the Wisconsin Territory
Robert H. Jackson (1892–1954), Attorney General of the United States
Samuel D. Jackson (1895–1951), Attorney General of Indiana
William S. Jackson (died 1932), Attorney General of New York

See also
General Jackson (disambiguation)